

Angel O'Day

Ogre
Ogre is a DC Comics character who appeared in Batman #535 (October 1996), created by Doug Moench and Kelley Jones.
Ogre is a genetically altered man, whose brother is a genetically experimented Ape created by Doctor Winston Belmont. The man, Michael Adams, was increased in strength and the Ape in intelligence. The project created by Belmont was Project Mirakle, a top secret government project at Atsugi, where there were tested spy planes, as well as experiments on humans in the late 1950s. These experiments were made to create the perfect human agent but when funding was excavated so were the subjects. Michael Adams, as 23rd human experiment, managed to escape after 22 previous deaths. The Ogre tracked and murdered the scientists who collaborated with the project, only to be tracked by Batman himself. In the end, the Ape died and the Ogre wandered amidst the city alone in a story analogous to Mary Shelley's Frankenstein.

Ogre in other media
 A different variation of the character appears in Gotham, portrayed by Milo Ventimiglia. This version is Jason Skolimski (using an alias Jason Lennon), a son of unnamed mother and Jacob Skolimski, the butler who worked for rich woman Constance van Groot. His biological mother left Jacob and Jason some time ago. When they came to service of Constance van Groot, Jason thought to believe that she is his mother, but she rejected him and in his rage killed her, taking her money and leaving the rotting corpse in her bedroom, with the help from his father. Jason made plastic surgery to his disfigured face in the clinic, where he was cured by a nurse Julie Kemble, the first murder victim. Over one decade, he became a serial killer in which he targets young and attractive successful women, kidnapping and keeping them for weeks or months and later murdering and dumping them in various places of Gotham, leaving behind a hand-made drawing of a broken heart. The GCPD keeps very quiet about the case, not even telling the press about his killings, and usually let the cases slip by because whenever Skolimski finds out his murders are being investigated, he goes after the loved ones of the detectives handling them. From those reasons, he is called the "Ogre" and "Don Juan Killer" (according to Harvey Bullock), and the Ogre is said to be handsome, rich and educated man in his profile. First appearing in "Beasts of Prey", Gordon and Bullock investigate the murder of missing model Grace Fairchild after Gordon accepted the case from police officer Len Moore; Gordon later realises that he was ordered by Commissioner Loeb to give him the case as an act of vengeance. In "Under the Knife", Gordon publicly tells to the public the details about him and his murder spree. He and Bullock discover his background and his father. During that time, Skolimski encounters Gordon's ex, Barbara Kean, inviting her in his house. Although he attempts to kill her, he saw something more in her, but Barbara tries to resist, forcing him to bound her in torture room. After freeing Barbara, Jason forces her to tell him whom to kill next. In "The Anvil or the Hammer", Gordon tries to find him, through the Foxglove club in which one member Sally (who was kidnapped by Jason before his murder spree, only to be spared by unknown reason) reveals that he is in Gotham Royal Hotel. Gordon and Bullock then go to Barbara's parents mansion, finding her parents murdered. Gordon finally shoots him and saves Barbara, albeit in shaken psychological state.

Chief O'Hara

Chief Miles Clancy O'Hara is a member of the Gotham City Police Department in the DC Universe based on the character of the same name from the television series Batman, portrayed by Stafford Repp.

The character, as adapted by Edmond Hamilton and Curt Swan, first appeared in the DC Universe in World's Finest Comics #159 (August 1966).

Within the context of the stories, Chief O'Hara is the chief of police during the early days of Batman's career. O'Hara was the first victim of the Hangman serial killer.

Alternate versions of Chief O'Hara
 Chief O'Hara appears in Tiny Titans #5, 33 and 48.
 Chief O'Hara appears in Batman: The Brave and the Bold #17.

Chief O'Hara in other media
 Chief O'Hara appears in Batman with Robin the Boy Wonder, voiced by Casey Kasem.
 Chief O'Hara appears in the animated films Batman: Return of the Caped Crusaders and Batman vs. Two-Face, voiced by Thomas Lennon.
 The daughter of Chief O'Hara (Chief O'Hara II) was created for The Lego Batman Movie, voiced by Lauren White, and appears in the Batman '66 tie-in comics.

Onyx
Onyx is a DC Comics character who appeared in Detective Comics #546 (January 1985), created by Joey Cavalieri and Jerome K. Moore.

A former member of the League of Assassins, Onyx forsook that life and joined the same ashram monastery that the Green Arrow once belonged to. When the order's master was killed, she sought the Green Arrow to take down his killer. Onyx came to Star City seeking that same killer again.

She later became an ally to Batman during the Batman: War Games story arc when she joined the Hill Gang (led by Gotham City undercover agent and Batman's ally Orpheus), but she assumed the leadership following the latter's murder by Black Mask.

Following this story arc, she was not seen again until it was revealed that she worked as one of the Oracle's contacts for the Birds of Prey.

She became a trainer for Cassandra Cain in Bludhaven.

Onyx in other media 
 Onyx Adams appears in the Arrow episode "Next of Kin", portrayed by Chastity Dotson. This version is a former member of the League of Assassins from 1743 who used a Lazarus Pit to survive into the present and become a black ops agent in Syria before several members of her team betrayed her. She forms a new team to kill the defectors, but is ultimately defeated by John Diggle and his allies and arrested by the police.
 Onyx makes a non-speaking appearance in Batman: Bad Blood as a member of Leviathan. This version expresses romantic feelings for her superior, the Heretic, despite being frustrated by his inability to truly feel emotions. In the hopes of fixing this, she and the Heretic kidnap Damian Wayne in an attempt to absorb his memories, only for Talia al Ghul to kill the Heretic. Onyx seeks vengeance on her, which culminates in her eventually attacking Talia on a hovercraft and causing the vessel to crash and explode.
 A teenage Onyx Adams appears in Young Justice: Phantoms, voiced by Logan Browning. This version was raised by her maternal grandfather Amazing-Man, but ran away from home due to the fear that she could not live up to his moral standards, which she later regrets, and was recruited by Sensei to join the League of Shadows. In the present, she is unknowingly tricked by the League into defecting from them and cause confusion for the Team. After joining forces with Artemis Crock and Cheshire to rescue Orphan, Onyx stays on Infinity Island to rehabilitate from her experience with the League.

Orca

Otis

Otis is Lex Luthor's bumbling henchman from the films Superman (1978) and Superman II (1980), portrayed by Ned Beatty.

Films
Otis was a henchman working for Lex Luthor when he was plotting to steal two nuclear test missiles from the United States military to pull off the greatest criminal real estate scheme of owning hundreds of acres of land east of the San Andreas Fault by destroying much of California with an earthquake. Otis was put in the same penitentiary as Lex Luthor after Superman stopped the missiles and the earthquake.

In Superman II, he joined Luthor in his escape from prison when Eve Teschmacher arrived in a hot-air balloon to provide a getaway vehicle that would take him north to "Superman's secret", the Fortress of Solitude. Unfortunately, Otis was left behind in the penitentiary when he tried to climb up the balloon's ladder and caused it to be pulled toward the ground, forcing Luthor to dislodge the ladder from the balloon.

Otis in comics
Otis appears in Forever Evil #2 (December 2013). He appears as a LexCorp security guard. Otis is killed by Bizarro when Lex Luthor releases him from his stasis tube.

Alternate versions of Otis
Otis appears in Superman Family Adventures #05 and 07.

Television
 In The World's Greatest Super Friends episode "Lex Luthor Strikes Back", there is a character based on Otis named Orville Gump (voiced by William Callaway). Orville Gump was the bumbling sidekick of criminal mastermind Lex Luthor.
 Dr. Otis Ford appears in the Smallville season 4 episode "Scare", portrayed by Malcolm Stewart. Otis is a doctor employed by LuthorCorp to manage a defense contract project involving a gas that causes exposed people to hallucinate their worst nightmare.
 Otis appears in the Young Justice episode "Satisfaction", voiced by Kevin Michael Richardson and in the "Young Justice" tie-in comic book #21-22. Otis is the commander of Lex Luthor's security force.	
 Otis Graves appears in season 4 of Supergirl, portrayed by Robert Baker. This version is Mercy Graves' brother and a former Project Cadmus agent. Mercy and Otis are seemingly killed by the Hellgrammite, who surrendered to the DEO. Otis turns up alive, where he was the one who sniped Jimmy Olsen, as it was revealed that Lex made him into Metallo. When Supergirl and Lena Luthor found information in Lex Luthor's cell, Otis was told to go into a location and stand there as Otis explodes. Lex then has Otis put back together. Ben later visits Otis, where he unknowingly tells him of Lex Luthor's plot to look like he reformed. This causes Ben to kill Otis. In the episode "It's a Super Life", Mister Mxyzptlk shows Kara a possible reality where she revealed her identity to Lena from the start. This led to Otis and Agent Liberty abducting Lena Luthor and Thomas Coville to coerce Supergirl into revealing her identity. In season six following the "Crisis on Infinite Earths", Otis turns up alive and worked with Lillian Luthor to further her son's plot.
 Otis appears in Superman Returns: Prequel Comic #3 (August 2006).
 Otis Berg appears in the Smallville Season 11 tie-in comics. Otis Berg was Lex Luthor's personal assistant in LexCorp and is killed by the Monitor.

References

 DC Comics characters: O, List of